Ralph Earle Jr. (January 17, 1908 – May 23, 1995) was a biblical scholar.

He was born in Dighton, Massachusetts.

He authored and edited many scholarly articles and books, including several Bible commentaries. He served as a pastor in Woonsocket, Rhode Island and Everett, Massachusetts while on faculty at alma mater Eastern Nazarene College in Quincy, Massachusetts, from 1933 to 1945. He was an ordained minister in the Church of the Nazarene.

Earle was founding Professor of New Testament at Nazarene Theological Seminary in Kansas City, Missouri from 1945 to 1977 and served on the Committee on Bible Translation for the New International Version of the Bible. Earle joined the Evangelical Theological Society as a charter member in 1950, served on the executive committee from 1958 to 1966, and was president in 1962.

Education 
Earle completed his undergraduate work and earned a Bachelor of Arts from Eastern Nazarene College before earning his Master's degree from Boston University. He completed BD and Th.D. programs at Gordon Divinity School before pursuing postdoctoral studies at Edinburgh University in Scotland, Episcopal Theological School, and Harvard University. He also held an honorary D.D. from Eastern Nazarene.

Death 
Earle died on May 23, 1995, eleven days after suffering a stroke.

Works 
 How We Got Our Bible
 Word Meanings in the New Testament
 Beacon Bible Commentary (New Testament editor)
 Wesleyan Bible Commentary (New Testament editor)
 Adam Clarke's Commentary, One-Volume Edition (editor/abridger)
 Expositor's Bible Commentary (contributor)

Notes and references 

1908 births
1995 deaths
20th-century translators
American biblical scholars
American Nazarene ministers
Arminian ministers
Arminian theologians
Boston University alumni
Eastern Nazarene College alumni
Eastern Nazarene College faculty
Gordon–Conwell Theological Seminary alumni
Harvard University alumni
Nazarene Theological Seminary faculty
People from Dighton, Massachusetts
Translators of the Bible into English